Bluefield may refer to:
Bluefield, Virginia, US
Bluefield, West Virginia, US
Nvidia BlueField, a line of computer hardware

See also
Bluefields, Nicaragua
Bluefields, Jamaica